The Lifted Brow is both the name of an Australian not-for-profit literary organisation (also less well known as the TLB Society Inc.), and the quarterly print literary magazine/journal it publishes. It also publishes its books through its Brow Books imprint, and posts original work on its website, stages events, runs writing contests, and more. Founded in Brisbane, the headquarters was quickly established in Melbourne and it has been based there since.

History
TLB was established in 2007 by Ronnie Scott, and then run from 2012 to 2020 by Sam Cooney. It is currently on an extended hiatus. It is a not-for-profit literary organisation which also runs the book publishing imprint Brow Books. It has been funded in part by Creative Victoria and the Australia Council, as well as other funding bodies. The organisation is run by volunteers.

In April 2020 The Lifted Brow announced a pause in operations following an investigation by the board into allegations of sexual misconduct and unprofessional conduct by TLB workers. Following this investigation, many of the staff, along with the entire governing board, resigned. A new board installed themselves in mid-2020 but no activity has occurred since.

The Lifted Brow

The Lifted Brow is an Australian quarterly print literary magazine/journal. There is also a digital version available.

History and profile
The Lifted Brow was established in 2007 by Ronnie Scott and edited by him until 2012. In 2012 Sam Cooney took as editor until 2014 when he handed over editorial duties to Ellena Savage, Stephanie Van Schilt and Gillian Terzis who edited the publication for a couple of years, before Annabel Brady-Brown and Zoe Dzunko took over in 2016. The magazine was also edited by Justin Wolfers, and then Jini Maxwell, who co-edited until 2020.

Contributors who have appeared in the magazine include Margaret Atwood, Neil Gaiman, Wayne Koestenbaum, Helen Garner, Anne Boyer, Douglas Coupland, Roxane Gay, Heidi Julavits, Tom Bissell, Eileen Myles, Margo Lanagan, Tracy K. Smith, Diane Williams, Sam Lipsyte, Sheila Heti, and thousands of others.

Loosely falling under the literary journal category, the magazine features longform non-fiction and fiction, flash fiction, commentary, criticism, poetry, as well as artwork, drawings, comics, and music. Early versions of the publication were a perfect-bound journal format, and then in its middle years it embraced the tabloid newsprint format, before in 2015 evolving to the high-quality matte magazine format that is currently published four times annually. For a few years editions of The Lifted Brow included an arts and cultural lift-out called 'Middlebrow', which featured film, book, and television reviews, and articles profiling new video games, theatre, and music. Some editions have been themed; themes have included "Food", "Music", "Capitalism", "Medicine", "Art", and "Perth". The theme for December 2019 was "Digital Intimacies". The most successful issue ever of the magazine in terms of impact and sales was the Blak Brow edition, edited and designed and managed entirely by Australian First Nations people, and publishing only First Nations contributors.

In 2013 TLB published its first anthology: The Best of The Lifted Brow: Volume One. Edited by Ronnie Scott and celebrating the first five years of the magazine (2007–2011). It featured Jim Shepard, Karen Russell, Daniel Handler, Lisa Brown, Heidi Julavits, Adam Levin, Karen Coin, Rick Moody, Robert Shearman, n a bourke, Glen David Gold, Blake Butler, Michaela McGuire, Liam Pieper, Romy Ash, Luke Ryan, Tao Lin, Benjamin Law, Benjamin Kunkel, Christos Tsiolkas, Tom Cho, Alice Pung, and Elspeth Muir. The second volume of The Best of The Lifted Brow was published in November 2017 and included contributions from Eileen Myles, Wayne Macauley, Paola Balla, Peter Polites, Margaret Atwood, Margo Lanagan, Darren Hanlon, Upulie Divisekera, Fiona Wright, Safia Elhillo, Ellena Savage, Ryan O'Neill, Briohny Doyle, Chris Somerville, Adam Curley, Rosanna Stevens, Shaun Prescott, Pip Smith, Nic Low, Rebecca Harkins-Cross, Wendy Xu, Matthew Hickey, Sam George-Allen, Zora Sanders, Nic Holas, Regrette Etcetera, Oscar Schwartz, Dion Kagan, Jana Perkovic, Danez Smith, Eugenia Flynn, and Khalid Warsame.

In 2015, The Lifted Brow launched its annual Prize for Experimental Non-fiction, which first went to Oscar Schwartz for his piece 'Humans Pretending to be Computers Pretending to be Humans', judged by John D’Agata, Daniel M Lavery, and Rebecca Giggs. The 2016 prize judges were Helen Macdonald, Kate Zambreno, Dodie Bellamy and Maria Tumarkin, and they declared W.J.P. Newnham's piece 'Trashman Loves Maree' the winner. In 2017 the judges were Eileen Myles, Wayne Koestenbaum, Leslie Jamison, Fiona Wright and Claudia La Rocco, and the winner was 'An Architecture of Early Motherhood (and Independence)’, by Stephanie Guest and Kate Riggs. In 2018 judges Nadja Spiegelman, Ander Monson and Ellena Savage chose 'big beautiful female theory' by Eloise Grills as the winner. In 2019 Timmah Ball, Chris Kraus and Quinn Eades judged, with 'TRETINOIN' by Jean Bachoura the winner.

In 2015, The Lifted Brow won the inaugural 'Best Original Non-fiction' prize, judged by Shazna Nessa and Lynn Barber, at the Stack Magazines awards, beating out over 170 other titles. After being shortlisted several more times over the years in several of the award's categories, they won 'Best Original Non-fiction' again in 2019.

As of March 2020 there had been 45 issues of The Lifted Brow published. In April 2020 The Lifted Brow announced a pause in operations following the global COVID-19 pandemic and also an investigation by the board into sexual misconduct and unprofessional conduct by a TLB worker, which found the allegations either untrue or unable to be resolved. Following this process, the board resigned en masse; a new board consisting of staff members installed themselves in mid-2020.

Brow Books
In 2015, The Lifted Brow announced that it was expanding into book publishing. Brow Books was created in 2016 to publish the authors and books that established publishing houses were largely ignoring due to perceived lack of commercial viability.

In 2018, the Brow put out a call soliciting manuscripts translated by Australians. "If you are translating a work from a language that is underrepresented, we want to hear from you." The Brow also entered into a co-publishing agreement with Tilted Axis, a nonprofit dedicated to publishing contemporary Asian literature. The agreement gives Brow right of first refusal in Australia and New Zealand for Tilted Axis titles.

Published works 
2016

 The Island Will Sink, the debut novel of longtime Lifted Brow contributor Briohny Doyle

2017

 Shaun Prescott's debut novel The Town
 Law School by Benjamin Law and Jenny Phang, with illustrations by Beatrix Urkowitz
 The Best of The Lifted Brow: Volume Two

2018

 Axiomatic by Maria Tumarkin, a Stella Prize shortlisted novel
 Apple and Knife, a collection of short stories by Indonesian writer Intan Paramaditha, translated by Stephen J Epstein of Victoria University of Wellington
 Pink Mountain on Locust Mountain, Jamie Marina Lau's Stella Prize shortlisted debut novel
 Han Yujoo's The Impossible Fairytale, translated from Korean by Janet Hong
 One Good Turn, the first book of Mary Leunig's illustrations to be published in 25 years
 Small Beauty, by debut author Jiaqing Wilson-Yang
 Balancing Acts: Women in Sport, edited by Justin Wolfers with Erin Riley. Contributors to this non-fiction work include Brunette Lenkic, Imogen Smith, Jodi McAlister, Nicole Hayes, Danielle Warby, Kasey Symons, Emma Jenkins, Erin Stewart, Ellen Van Neerven, Kate Doak, Holly Isemonger, Gina Rushton, Charlotte Guest, Katerina Bryant, Nadia Bailey, Savannah Indigo, Stephanie King, Laura Buzo, Roslyn Helper, and Rebecca Slater.
 Going Postal: More Than 'Yes' or 'No', edited by Quinn Eades and Son Vivienne

2019

 Comic artist Mandy Ord's When One Person Dies The Whole World is Over
 This Young Monster by Charlie Fox
 Bright by Duanwad Pimwana, the first English language novel by a Thai woman to appear outside of Thailand. The text was translated by Mui Poopoksakul
2020
 The Relationship is the Project: Working with Communities, edited by Jade Lillie with Kate Larsen, Cara Kirkwood and Jax Jacki Brown
Apsara Engine by Bishakh Som
Dizzy Limits: Recent Experiments in Australian Nonfiction, an anthology edited by Sam Cooney and Freya Howarth

Signed works 
Brow Books had signed several books for publication before its hiatus began in early 2020. Most authors elected to leave and sign their books with other publishing houses in 2020, including:

 Gunk Baby by Jamie Marina Lau, a novel now with Hachette Australia
 Dropbear by Evelyn Araluen, a poetry collection now with University of Queensland Press
 Big Beautiful Female Theory by Eloise Grills, a narrative non-fiction work now with Affirm Press
 Stone Fruit by Lee Lai, a graphic novel not yet signed by another Australian publisher
 Anam by André Dao, an autofiction/autotheory work not yet signed by another publisher
 Traumascapes by Maria Tumarkin, a new edition of this non-fiction work
 Vietnamatta by Stephen Pham, a collection of writings not yet signed by another publisher
 Happiness by Nicky Minus, a graphic novel/book-length comic not yet signed by another publisher
 At Night He Lifts Weights by Kang Young-sook (translated by Janet Hong), a short fiction collection not yet signed by another publisher
 Fuji by Jamie Marina Lau, not yet signed by another publisher

See also
List of literary magazines

References

External links 
 The Lifted Brow website
Brow Books website 
 Review of Issue 7 on Crikey
 Review of Issue 29 on TEXT Journal
 Publication overview in The Times Literary Supplement
 S. Cooney profile

2007 establishments in Australia
Literary magazines published in Australia
Quarterly magazines published in Australia
Book review magazines
Biweekly magazines published in Australia
Magazines established in 2007
Mass media in Melbourne